The statue of Adalbert of Prague is an outdoor sculpture by Ferdinand Brokoff and Michal Jan Josef Brokoff, installed on the south side of the Charles Bridge in Prague, Czech Republic.

The original statue was moved, and a copy now stands in its place.

References

External links

 

Christian sculptures
Monuments and memorials in Prague
Sculptures of men in Prague
Statues on the Charles Bridge